Alexander Frank Wells (2 September 1912 – 28 November 1994), or A. F. Wells, was a British chemist and crystallographer. He is known for his work on structural inorganic chemistry, which includes the description and classification of structural motifs, such as the polyhedral coordination environments, in crystals obtained from X-ray crystallography. His work is summarized in a classic reference book, Structural inorganic chemistry, first appeared in 1945 and has since gone through five editions.

Education and career
Wells studied at The Queens' College, University of Oxford and obtained his BA and MA in 1934 and 1937, respectively. He then moved to University of Cambridge, where he obtained his PhD in X-ray crystallography in 1939, under the supervision of J. D. Bernal. His PhD thesis was titled The Crystal Structures of Certain Complex Metallic Compounds. He worked as research scientist at Cambridge from 1937 to 1940 and at University of Birmingham from 1940 till 1944. He moved to the industry afterwards, working as a senior research associate at Imperial Chemical Industries from 1944 to 1968. Wells was not interested in senior administrative jobs offer to him in the industry, he moved back to academia and became a Professor of Chemistry at University of Connecticut in the USA from 1968 until his retirement in 1980.

Personal life
Wells is known to his friends and family as Jumbo. He is an accomplished pianist. He married Ada Squires, then a widow, in 1939. During World War II, Wells worked on developing phosphors to be used in cathode-ray tubes and in helping service people move about in the dark.

Bibliography

Paper series

Other selected papers

Books

See also
 Periodic graph (crystallography)
 Coordination geometry
 Michael O'Keeffe (chemist)
 List of books about polyhedra

References

British chemists
1912 births
1994 deaths
British crystallographers
University of Connecticut faculty
Alumni of the University of Oxford
Alumni of the University of Cambridge
Imperial Chemical Industries people
Crystallographers
Inorganic chemists
20th-century British chemists